The 2020 Milan–San Remo was scheduled to be held on 21 March 2020, but was postponed to 8 August due to the COVID-19 pandemic in Italy. The postponement was made by RCS Sport on 6 March.  It was the 111th edition of the Milan–San Remo one-day cycling classic in Northern Italy, and part of the 2020 UCI World Tour calendar. 

Teams

All nineteen UCI WorldTeams and eight UCI ProTeams were invited to the race. Each of the twenty-seven teams entered six riders each that made up the 162 riders that participated in the race, of which 149 riders finished.

UCI WorldTeams

 
 
 
 
 
 
 
 
 
 
 
 
 
 
 
 
 
 
 

UCI ProTeams

Result

References

External links

Milan–San Remo
Milan-San Remo
Milan-San Remo
Milan-San Remo
Milan-San Remo